Asha Negi (born 23 August 1989) is an Indian television actress. She is known for playing Purvi Deshmukh in Pavitra Rishta and Gauravi Karmarkar in Baarish. In 2010, Negi debuted into television with the role of Madhura in Sapnon Se Bhare Naina and later appeared as Apeksha Malhotra in Ekta Kapoor's Bade Achhe Lagte Hain on Sony TV in 2011. She achieved her breakthrough performance in the soap opera Pavitra Rishta where she played Purvi Deshmukh from 2011 to 2014.

In 2013, she won the dance reality show Nach Baliye 6 with her Pavitra Rishta co-star and partner Rithvik Dhanjani. Her other roles were in Ek Mutthi Aasmaan as Suhana/Kalpana on Zee TV and Kuch Toh Hai Tere Mere Darmiyaan as Koyal on StarPlus. Later, she participated in Fear Factor: Khatron Ke Khiladi 6  on Colors TV. In 2019, she featured in the web series Baarish as Gauravi Karmakar opposite Sharman Joshi.

Early life

Negi was born and raised in Dehradun, Uttarakhand to LS.Negi and Beena Negi. In 2009, she was crowned Miss Uttarakhand 2009. She eventually moved to Mumbai to pursue an acting career.

Personal life 
Negi began a relationship with her Pavitra Rishta costar Rithvik Dhanjani in 2013.
They later broke up in 2020 after 7 years of dating.

Career

Debut
Negi started her career as a model in 2009 after she won the title of Miss Uttarakhand 2009 during her college days. She appeared in various advertisements for companies and did many photo shoots. Later she auditioned for her first TV show in 2010 with the StarPlus show Sapnon Se Bhare Naina playing the role as Madhura. In 2011, Negi appeared on the Balaji Telefilms series Bade Achhe Lagte Hain, where she played the negative role Apeksha Malhotra. She has acknowledged the show as a great experience and has cited lead actress Sakshi Tanwar as her inspiration.

Breakthrough (2011–2014)

Her first main role was in 2011 when she was cast in part in Zee TV's Pavitra Rishta, as the intelligent, beautiful and determined Purvi Desmukh, the adopted daughter of Archana Deskmukh (Ankita Lokhande). She has won the stellar performer of the year in Gold Awards and was awarded the popular favourite Jodi at Zee Rishtey awards with Rithvik. Negi has also won the Fresh Face Female at Indian Telly Awards.

In November 2013, Negi participated in the dance couple reality show Nach Balliye 6 along with her partner Dhanjani. They both were one of the entertaining contestants. In February 2014, they both became the winner of the dance show.

In August 2014, Negi entered the Zee TV show Ek Mutthi Aasmaan. She played the role as Kalpana Raghav Singhania opposite Ashish Chaudhary. She made a small appearance in the &TV show Killerr Karaoke Atka Toh Latkah in March 2015.

Khatron Ke Khiladi and further success (2015–present)

Negi participated in the celebrity stunt based show Fear Factor: Khatron Ke Khiladi in 2015. She became one of the finalists on the show. She then appeared in the Ekta Kapoor show Kumkum Bhagya along with Dhanjani reprising their roles in Pavitra Rishta. She also did an episodic appearance in Code Red. She also was a team member in Box Cricket League in Season 1 in 2015 along with Season 2 of BCL. Later, hosted the singing reality show Indian Idol in 2015.

In November 2015, Negi was approached and finalised to replace Shritama Mukherjee in the StarPlus show Kuch Toh Hai Tere Mere Darmiyaan opposite Gautam Gupta and Aly Goni. She plays the role of Gauravi Mehta in web series of Alt Balaji named Baarish opposite Sharman Joshi.

Other work and Appearances

In March 2012, Negi appeared as Purvi in the special episode of Punar Vivaah. In August 2012, she again performed for the 5th Boroplus Gold Awards along with Dhanjani. Later she made a special appearance in two shows Hitler Didi and Sapne Suhane Ladakpan Ke.
 In the grand finale of Bigg Boss 6, Negi made a special appearance and performed in the Bigg Boss house along with Rati Pandey, Pooja Gor and Rashami Desai.

Later she performed at Zee Rishtey Awards 2013. In 2014, Negi performed with Rithvik at the Star Parivaar Awards 2014. Negi also did photo shoots for a television calendar in 2014 and 2016. In 2014, she made a guest appearance on Jamai Raja (2014 TV series) with Sargun Mehta. Later she made another appearance in Kumkum Bhagya in 2015.

Filmography

Films

Television

Web series

Awards and nominations

References

External links

 
 

1989 births
Living people
Actresses from Dehradun
Indian soap opera actresses
Indian television actresses
Nach Baliye winners
21st-century Indian actresses
Actresses in Hindi television
Fear Factor: Khatron Ke Khiladi participants